Hedd Records was a subsidiary record label of Virgin Records.

Artists
Cleopatra Jones
The Seers
Soho

British record labels
Virgin Records